Mile End is a district of London, England

Mile End may also refer to:

Mile End (UK Parliament constituency)
Mile End, Cambridgeshire, a location in England
Mile End, Cheshire, England
Mile End, Devon, England
Mile End, Gloucestershire, a small village near Coleford, England
Mile End, Montreal, Canada
Mile End, South Australia, Australia
Mile End, Suffolk, a location in England
Mile End New Town, London, England
Historical name for Myland, Essex, England
Landport in Portsmouth, England, which had an area called Mile End within it
Bridgeton, Glasgow, which has a district originally known as Mile-End

Other
Mile End Delicatessen, a Jewish deli in Boerum Hill, Brooklyn, United States
Mile-End School, Aberdeen
"Mile End", song by Pulp on the Trainspotting soundtrack